The 1912 Kansas gubernatorial election was held on November 5, 1912. Democratic nominee George H. Hodges narrowly defeated Republican nominee Arthur Capper with 46.55% of the vote.

General election

Candidates
Major party candidates 
George H. Hodges, Democratic
Arthur Capper, Republican

Other candidates
George W. Kleihege, Socialist

Results

References

1912
Kansas
Gubernatorial